Montebello was an Océan type 118-gun ship of the line of the French Navy. She was launched in 1812 and refitted in 1821.

Career 
On 31 October 1836, she was driven ashore at the Grosse Tour, Toulon. She was subsequently refloated.

In 1851, she was refitted to receive a  steam engine. During trials, performance under sail was poor, probably because of the propeller which increased the drag.

She took part in the Crimean war as admiral Armand Joseph Bruat's flagship, in June 1854. An epidemic of cholera affected 300 sailors aboard, of whom 120 died, including Bruat.

On 5 March 1855 she took part in the Siege of Sevastopol, then in the expedition to Kerch and in the Battle of Kinburn.

In 1860, Montebello replaced Suffren at Toulon as a school-ship for gunnery, and in 1867, she was used as a floating barracks. She was scrapped in 1889.

References

 Jean-Michel Roche, Dictionnaire des Bâtiments de la flotte de guerre française de Colbert à nos jours, tome I
 1812. Le Montebello de Sané (France) 
 Armement du vaisseau à trois-ponts le Montebello (1834), Nicolas Mioque

Ships of the line of the French Navy
Océan-class ships of the line
1812 ships
Maritime incidents in October 1836